The 1974 Charlotte Tennis Classic, also known by its sponsored name North Carolina National Bank Tennis Classic,  was a men's tennis tournament played on outdoor clay courts that was part of the blue group of the World Championship Tennis (WCT) circuit. It was the fourth edition of the tournament and was held from April 15 through April 21, 1974 at the Julian J. Clark Tennis Stadium on the grounds of the Olde Providence Racquet Club in Charlotte, North Carolina in the United States. Eighth-seeded Jeff Borowiak won the singles title.

Finals

Singles
 Jeff Borowiak defeated  Dick Stockton 6–4, 5–7, 7–6(7–5)
 It was Borowiak's first singles title of his career.

Doubles
 Buster Mottram /  Raúl Ramírez defeated  Owen Davidson /  John Newcombe 6–3, 1–6, 6–3

References

External links
 ITF tournament edition details

Charlotte Tennis Classic
Charlotte Tennis Classic
Charlotte Tennis Classic
Charlotte Tennis Classic